Grimontia is a genus of bacteria from the family of Vibrionaceae.

References

Further reading 

 

Vibrionales
Bacteria genera
Taxa described in 2003